The 2016–17 season was Olympiacos's 58th consecutive season in the Super League Greece and their 91st year in existence. The club become the national champions for 7th consecutive year, equalizing the previous record Olympiacos also has for the period 1997–2003 – and for 19th time during the last 21 seasons. Olympiacos participated in the UEFA Europa League and in the Greek Football Cup.

The season was marked by continuous changes of coaches, having changed coaches 5 times during the season. Marco Silva, Víctor Sánchez, Paulo Bento, Vasilis Vouzas and Takis Lemonis coached the team from June 2016 to June 2017.

Players

Final squad

For recent transfers, see List of Greek football transfers summer 2016

Youth players registered in first team 

Olympiacos U20 is the youth team of Olympiacos. They participate in the Super League U20 championship and in UEFA Youth League competition. They play their home games at the 3,000-seater Renti Training Centre in Renti, Piraeus.

International players

Foreign players

Other players under contract

Transfers and loans

Transfers in

Summer 2016

 (fee: €1.4M)
 (fee: €537K)

 (loan return)
 (loan return)
 (loan return)
 (loan return)
 (loan return)
 (loan return)
 (loan return)
 (loan return)
 (loan return)
 (loan return)
 (loan return)
 (loan return)
 (loan return)
 (loan return)
 (loan return)
 (loan return)

Winter 2016–2017

 (with buying option)
 (with buying option)
 (loan return)
 (loan return)

Transfers out

Summer 2016

 (fee: €3M)

 (fee: €2.5M)
 (fee: €7M)

Winter 2016–2017

Personnel

Management 

|}

Coaching, technical and medical staff

Scouting staff

Olympiacos Academy

Friendlies

June friendlies

July friendlies

August friendlies 

Notes

Competitions

Super League Greece

League table

Results summary

Results by round

Matches

(Source:)
(originally scheduled on 21 August 2016)
(originally scheduled on 28 August 2016)
(originally scheduled on 19 November 2016)

Greek Football Cup

Matches

Group stage
Group B

Round of 16
The draw for this round took place on 20 December 2016.

The first leg was originally scheduled on 11 January 2017, 19:30

Quarter-finals
The draw for this round took place on 27 January 2017.

Semi-finals
The draw for this round took place on 21 March 2017 (after being delayed on 18 March 2017).

UEFA Champions League

Third qualifying round

All times at EET

UEFA Europa League

Play-off round

All times at EET

Group stage

Times from matchday 1 to 3 at UTC+3. The rest at UTC+2.

Knockout phase

Round of 32

All times at EET

Round of 16

All times at EET

References

External links 
 Official Website of Olympiacos Piraeus 

Olympiacos F.C. seasons
Olympiacos
Olympiacos F.C.
Olympiacos F.C.
Greek football championship-winning seasons